The Collected Works of Tourniquet is the first compilation album by the American Christian metal band Tourniquet. It was released on Intense Records in 1996. The album features fourteen songs: eleven songs are taken directly from the band's previous releases, though "The Skeezix Dilemma" has been edited in that it uses the majority of the studio recording and segues into the live version's ending from Intense Live Series, Vol. 2 (1993), and it introduces two new songs, "Perfect Night for a Hanging" and "The Hand Trembler".

Track listing

 appears on The Epic Tracks (2019)

Personnel
 "Perfect Night for a Hanging" and "The Hand Trembler" produced by Tourniquet and Bill Metoyer
 Mixed by Bill Metoyer
 Recorded and mixed at Mixing Lab A in Huntington Beach, California
 Creative director: Stormy Rodman
 Art direction: Terry DeGraff
 Art and design: Brandy Flower
 Cover illustration: Tim White
 Photography
 Individual photos: Jim Muth
 Group photos: Larry Bolen
 Songs digitally remastered by Eddie Schreyer at Future Disc in Hollywood, California

References

External links
The Collected Works of Tourniquet at Tourniquet.net

Tourniquet (band) albums
1996 compilation albums
Thrash metal compilation albums